This is a list of notable events relating to the environment in 1964. They relate to environmental law, conservation, environmentalism and environmental issues.

Events

January
The United States Army Corps of Engineers built a dike around the Estelline Salt Springs which caused an increase in salinity, driving many species to extinction, including Hemigrapsus estellinensis and an undescribed barnacle.

April
Rachel Carson, author of the influential book Silent Spring, dies at the age of 56.

See also

Human impact on the environment

References